In-soon is pretty is a 2007 South Korean television series starring Kim Hyun-joo, Kim Min-jun, Lee Wan. It aired on KBS2's Wednesday and Thursday at 09:50 - 10:50 (KST) time slot from November 7 to December 27, 2007.

Synopsis 

The story of reconciling life after prison of Park In-soo, a girl accidentally killed a bully in high school. She was convicted of the crime of manslaughter. After imprisonment, she tried to start her new life. But her criminal records made her difficult to find jobs and face discrimination from people. With a variety of events, soon reunited with her mother, who abandoned her as soon as her father died, meet with her high school teacher to find encourage or even decided to commit suicide. Can she still have a new happy life?

Cast

Main 
Kim Hyun-joo as Park In-sun
Hong Ah-reum as teenage Park In-soon 
Kim Min-jun as Yoo Sang-woo
Choi Won-tae as teenage Yoo Sang-woo
Lee Wan as Chang Keun-soo.

Supporting

People around Sang-woo
Kim Mi-kyung as Oh Myung-sook (Sang Woo's mother)
Choi Il-hwa as Yoo Byung-gook (Sang Woo's father)
Na Yoon as Song Jin-tae (TV station)
Jo Deok-hyeon as Go Jae-sik(TV station)
Lee In-hye as Han Jae-eun

People around In-soon
Na Young-hee as Lee Seon-young (In Soon's mother)
Seo Hyo-rim as Kim Jung-ah (In Soon's sister)
Eom Hyo-seop as Seo Kyung-joon (high school teacher)
Lee Hyun-joon as Seo Eun-seok (Kyung Joon's son)
Park Soon-cheon as Park Ok-seon (In Soon's aunt)
Jang Young-ran as Go Mi-hwa (In Soon's friend)

Others
Cha Young-ok as Nam So-jeong (Sun Young's friend)
Lee Mae-ri as Han Mi-jin (high school cafeteria)

Original soundtrack

Production
 The drama started filming at 25 July 2007
 The press conference held at a cafe in Yongsan, Seoul on the 17th Oct, 2007
This is Kim Hyun-joo's drama after two years
This is the second collaboration between PD Pyo Min-soo and writer Jung Yoo-kyung of MBC's drama Which Star Are You From? . 
This is Kim Hyun-joo's first KBS appearance since her debut in 1997. This drama, Boys Over Flowers and Partner are three consecutive KBS dramas.
Kim Hyun-joo appeared in this drama and did not get paid properly, so she filed a lawsuit against the drama's production company and her former agency, and eventually won .
Director Pyo Min-soo, actors Seo Hyo-rim and Na Young-hee meet again in 2008 in drama The world they live in.

Ratings
In this table,  represent the lowest ratings and  represent the highest ratings.

Awards and nominations

References

External links
  
 

2007 South Korean television series debuts
2007 South Korean television series endings
Korean Broadcasting System television dramas